The Carezza Dolomites or Karersee Dolomiten (Tyrolean German) is a section of the Dolomites mountain range in South Tyrol, a linguistically German region in the Italian Alps. Located next to the mountains Rosengarten and Latemar, the Carezza Dolomites are very popular with vacationers and tourists. Both the German and Italian names of the area derived from that of Karersee, an alpine lake.  The villages closest to the Carezza Dolomites are Welschnofen and the eponymous Karersee (which is also in Welschnofen municipality).

Welschnofen is the main village (1,182 m) with a lot of accommodation possibilities, shops, restaurants and bars. Karersee is part of the comune of Welschnofen and lies 1,600 m above sea level at the foot of the famous Dolomites mountains Rosengarten and Latemar. Here you can find also several accommodations and possibilities to stop.

In summer the Carezza Dolomites area is known for the numerous hiking possibilities – about 116 km of perfectly signposted paths lead to mountain huts, inns and alps.

There are simple trails with panoramic view or for discerning people valley- and mountain-crossings, vie ferrate and climbing routes from the II. to the V.+ difficulty level. Hiking is possible from springtime to autumn and every season has his own attractions. To give variety to the vacation it’s also possible to go mountain biking, golfing, horse riding, swimming.

In winter, the Skiarea Carezza offers 100% guarantee of snow-sure skiing in the UNESCO World Natural Heritage of the Dolomites. With 40 perfectly groomed kilometers of slopes of varying degrees of diffi culty the Ski area Carezza offers skiing, carving, snowboarding and telemarking adventures of the highest quality for old and young in the unique landscape of the Dolomites.

It’s also possible to discover the mountain world not only by skiing: a lot of other leisure activities like winter hiking, sledging, cross country skiing, snow shoe hiking or ski tours complete the winter holiday experience.

References

Geography of South Tyrol
Tourist attractions in South Tyrol